The 1972 Paris–Nice was the 30th edition of the Paris–Nice cycle race and was held from 9 March to 16 March 1972. The race started in Paris and finished in Nice. The race was won by Raymond Poulidor of the Gan team.

General classification

References

1972
1972 in road cycling
1972 in French sport
March 1972 sports events in Europe
1972 Super Prestige Pernod